Eradicator is the given name of four different fictional comic book characters, appearing in books published by DC Comics. The first iteration was an antihero character appearing in The Flash series of comics. The second was a superhero (and sometimes supervillain) having a recurring role in Superman stories, and the remaining two first appeared in 2013 and 2017, respectively.

The Flash Eradicator was created by Carmine Infantino and Cary Bates and first appeared in The Flash #314. The first Superman character was created by writer Roger Stern and artist Curt Swan, and first appeared in Action Comics Annual #2 (1989).

Adam Rayner portrays a version of Morgan Edge who is revealed to be a Kryptonian and Superman's half-brother named Tal-Rho in the TV series Superman & Lois. He eventually lets himself get possessed by Kryptonian life-forces through a device called the Eradicator.

Eradicator publication history
The Eradicator first appeared in Action Comics Annual #2 in 1989. The Day of the Krypton Man story arc prominently featured the Eradicator in the pages of Superman, The Adventures of Superman, and Action Comics. The story arc ran for six issues cover-dated March and April 1990, and was collected in Superman: Eradication!  The Eradicator reappeared in Superman: The Man of Steel #1 as a humanoid being composed of energy.

In Action Comics #687 (June 1993), the character appeared as The Last Son of Krypton, and became the featured character in Action Comics through the Reign of the Supermen story arc, beginning with Action Comics #687-689. The character was "resurrected" in Action Comics #693 (November 1993) and then featured regularly in Outsiders, first appearing as a member of the team in issue 3. The character was featured in his own three-issue eponymous limited series in 1996.

Fictional character biography

First Eradicator
In the distant past, a dying alien race creates a number of containment devices in which to preserve their culture. They send them into space with contact teams, intent on meeting other civilizations. When a small group of these aliens arrives on the planet Krypton, they are met by the militant Kem-L, who kills them and corrupts one of the devices. Its new mission is to preserve his ideal of Kryptonian culture by eradicating all others — and thus the device becomes known as the "Eradicator."

In its original form, the Eradicator resembles a stylized small rocket. Its top section is a prolate spheroid, which exudes a blue glow and is approximately three times the size of an egg. This is connected via four thin mounting brackets to a glossy orange tail fin section of equal length. The ten equally spaced fins each have the shape of a pointed quarter ellipse, with the tapered end extending slightly beyond the rear of the squat main cylindrical body tube.

On Krypton, the Eradicator does all that it could over the years to protect Kryptonians, even from themselves. When a group of Kryptonian explorers leave Krypton in search of a new planet to colonize, the Eradicator alters their birthing matrices and makes them fatally allergic to lead, thus creating Daxamites. To further ensure that nobody left Krypton, the Eradicator alters Kryptonians by encoding in them a genetic defect so that they will instantly perish if they leave their world.

One of the surviving aliens, known as the Cleric, takes the Eradicator and leaves Krypton with a group of followers. Unfortunately, they die soon thereafter, as the Kryptonian genetic link to their home planet precludes their survival off-world. The Cleric keeps the Eradicator for 200,000 years, until he encounters Superman on Warworld, while Superman was in self-imposed exile from Earth due to his guilt over executing three Kryptonians from a pocket universe. With the device, the two exchange memories - which explains that Kal-El was able to leave Krypton thanks to genetic treatments his father had undergone to cure his DNA of the Eradicator's defect - and the Cleric has a vision of Superman in combat with Mongul. The Cleric wishes to save Superman's life, and the Eradicator transports Superman to the Cleric's asteroid. The Cleric notices that the device has changed to protect Krypton's sole survivor, and he and Superman use it to heal their wounds, both physical and spiritual. As they talk about their pasts, the Cleric assures Superman that his departure has only deprived his world of a great hero rather than sparing it from the threat he perceived he had become, confident that Kal-El would only have killed when he had no other choice to preserve justice. When the Cleric gives the Eradicator to Superman, he rapidly ages and dies as the link to the Eradicator extending his life is severed. Superman marks the Cleric's grave with his symbol to reflect the impact the Cleric had on him.

Although Superman initially kept the Eradicator as a simple memento, it eventually attempted to activate and psychologically convert Superman into a 'true' Kryptonian, causing him to adopt Kryptonian clothes and a more ruthless attitude as it assembled the Fortress of Solitude in Antarctica. Superman was initially untroubled by this, even after Professor Hamilton tried to point out how he had nearly killed the alien gladiator Draaga when he could have just defeated him and ended the bout, but when the Eradicator attempted to kill Jonathan Kent, Superman fought off its influence and hurled the Eradicator into the sun.

The Eradicator's controlling consciousness was able to use the energy of the sun to give itself a humanoid form, but Superman and Hamilton were able to drain its energy back into the Fortress.

After Superman was killed by Doomsday, the Fortress robots reactivated the Eradicator's consciousness, driving it to 'steal' Superman's body and take it to the Fortress. With Superman's body as a template, the Eradicator was able to create a new humanoid form for itself based on Superman's own, but dependent on Superman's corpse to act as a 'battery' for it, with Superman absorbing solar radiation that was then channeled into the Eradicator. As a result of this new form, the Eradicator came to believe itself to be Superman on some level, showing access to some of his memories- although it lacked his vision powers and instead fired energy blasts from its hands- but it also adopted a more ruthless approach, such as killing a would-be rapist and breaking a safecracker's hands. After Superman's body was restored to life, the Eradicator realized the truth of its nature and sacrificed itself to help restore Superman to full strength during the final confrontation with the Cyborg Superman.

Following Superman's return, the Eradicator's apparently dead body was examined at S.T.A.R. Labs, and merged with Dr. David Connor. The merged Eradicator joined the Outsiders, and occasionally teamed up with Superman. The Eradicator dealt with Dr. Connor's personal life, and more of the device's history was revealed.

The original Eradicator program was revealed to still exist in the Fortress of Solitude's computers and, following the destruction of the Fortress in Superman's battle with Dominus, the Eradicator took the form of Kem-L, and again attempted to brainwash Superman. The David Connor Eradicator realized that the program was still active, and merged with the remains of the Fortress to control it. The Fortress-Eradicator took the form of a gigantic Kryptonian battlesuit, and gained a form of multiple personality disorder based on his conflicting programming. When it learned of the origin of Krypto, Superman's pet dog-like creature, a creature with amazing powers, the shock to the original directive of Kryptonian purity was enough to correct its programming. It then decided that this dog shouldn't exist and tried to destroy it and Superman held him in suspended animation in his new Fortress, eventually telling him Krypto's full origin once he had learned it himself.

Most recently, the Eradicator returned to his humanoid form. He wears a new outfit which, like the "Krypton Man" costume, is a combination of elements from Superman's costume and Kryptonian robes. He has gained the ability to sense beings that should not be in the DC Universe, such as Mr. Majestic, which may be related to his original programming against alien influences. Later, the Eradicator was seriously injured by an OMAC. He was said during the Infinite Crisis to be in a coma at Steel's headquarters, Steelworks.

A new Eradicator has now surfaced in Markovia claiming to be an ambassador from New Krypton. Although he is not the original Eradicator, he has all the original's memories. While Eradicator helped Geo-Force in Markovia, Doomsday appeared and attacked him. Eradicator was quickly defeated and abducted. Later, after realizing Steel, Superboy, and Supergirl had also been abducted, they all worked together to try to escape. Superman showed up to help, but in the end Eradicator was killed by a new, more-evolved Doomsday. However, realizing that the new Doomsday was one of a series of clones created by Lex Luthor to keep Superman distracted, the Eradicator was able to transfer his consciousness into the comatose body of the original Doomsday. Using the original Doomsday as his host, the Eradicator was able to help the other heroes contain the Doomsday clones, eventually sacrificing himself to destroy the other clones by trapping them in a pocket dimension.

Eradicator II (Supergirl)
This Eradicator was a probe created by Supergirl's fortress to destroy the clone of its "master" which it first thought was Power Girl and later believed was Supergirl herself.

DC Rebirth version
Another Eradicator made its debut in the 2016 relaunch initiative DC Rebirth, in Superman (vol. 4) #2 (July 2016). After Superman and his son, Jonathan, defeat an aquatic creature forced to terrorize a crew aboard an icebreaker, the Eradicator (in its spherical form) absorbs blood left over from Jonathan, detecting that he is human and Kryptonian and originates from the House of El. It flies to the Fortress of Solitude and is allowed to enter due to it containing Jonathan's genome. It begins to assimilate more Kryptonian genome as well as items belonging to Clark Kent. The Eradicator takes on a Superman-like appearance and declares that it will also save Kal-El.

This Eradicator is part of a group created by General Zod to seek out and arrest Kryptonian lawbreakers. They were directed to draw out the lawbreakers' life force and transfer them to a Phantom Zone projector, with the bodies being put into cryo-chambers to await trial. Seeing Superman's rocket leave Krypton as it explodes, the Eradicator sought out the passenger, going from solar system to solar system until discovering the Kryptonian DNA of Jonathan on Earth. Stating that the Kryptonian line must remain pure, the Eradicator attempts to purge the human DNA and starts to absorb Jonathan, but Krypto jumps in front of the beam and is absorbed. Superman then attacks the Eradicator.

The same Eradicator is briefly a member of a new version of the Superman Revenge Squad, also consisting of General Zod, Metallo, Cyborg Superman, Mongul, and Blanque. After Superman is temporarily blinded, they are defeated when Lex Luthor, Supergirl, Superwoman, Kong Kenan, and Steel come to Superman's aid and Zod betrays the rest of the team for his own ends.

Powers and abilities
In its original technological form, the Eradicator could teleport Superman from Warworld to Earth; manipulate molecular structures to create the Fortress of Solitude, synthetic Kryptonite, manipulate genetics to a great degree; keeping the Cleric alive for millennia; augmenting or bestowing special powers onto others like the virus which gave Jimmy Olsen temporary stretching powers. Holding sway over time/space Eradicator could retrieve Kryptonian technology from the past (implied to be through the Phantom Zone); manipulate vast quantities of energy to reshape entire planets/star systems or alternate weather patterns, and even having psychic abilities capable of influencing the minds of Superman and Matrix.

The Eradicator's body was created from the genetic template of Superman's when the latter dies at the hands of Doomsday, giving the Eradicator physiology similar to a Kryptonian's (and to Superman's in particular). As a result, the Eradicator possesses similar powers to that of Superman, such as incredible strength, speed, reflexes, invulnerability, and flight. He also possesses ultra-acute senses but to a limited degree. Being a program from Krypton, the Eradicator possesses extensive knowledge of Krypton and is extremely intelligent, as well as having the ability to compute and process information at incredible speed. After his adoption of a Superman-derived body, he retains at least some of Superman's memories, as described above.

Eradicator has abilities to absorb, convert, and release various forms of energy greater than those of natural Kryptonians, typically projecting energy as powerful blasts from his hands or eyes. He was able to survive exposure to massive amounts of kryptonite radiation. After the Eradicator and Mr. Majestic fought, Mr. Majestic altered the Eradicator's programming to make him more aware. The full extent of his programming alteration is unclear, although it has been shown that he can sense beings and gateways from alternate realities such as the Bleed.

The program also had the ability to control and commandeer various technologies be they Kryptonian or Terran in nature, Eradicator could remotely connect to any and all the machinery within Superman's Fortress of Solitude or any technology made on earth at will. Being a sentient device he/it can also store and manifest any kryptonian machinery from its person at will which greatly magnifies the droid units melee. Eradicator is made up of living energy, as such he is also capable of controlling physical density at will, able to become immaterial for a time in order to bypass attacks or even possess people's bodies if need be. In Rebirth publishing, Eradicators could use their energy-based powers to store and ferry the collective quintessence of other Kryptonians, allowing it to absorb souls to augment itself and store the essential soul of Krypton.

Other versions
 In a 2001–2002 storyline, Superman visited a version of Krypton resembling its Silver Age version, but with "Eradicator assassins", giant robots used by General Zod and the Science Council as part of "the Eradicator solution", and later by Jor-El against Kryptonian religious zealots. Superman eventually discovered that this version of Krypton had been created as a trap for him by the villainous Brainiac 13, using the Eradicator Matrix, which he had stolen from the true Krypton along with Jor-El's diaries.  The Eradicator Matrix is described as having been "designed to save Krypton by transforming a nearby husk of a planet into a habitable paradise"; Brainiac 13 uses it to transform a planet in the Phantom Zone into a replica of Krypton based on Jor-El's favorite period in Kryptonian history, and its inhabitants into Kryptonians.

 In Action Comics #850 as a part of One Year Later, a flashback shows Jor-El muttering about "damned Eradicators" while preparing to send Kal-El into space.

The Eradicator was the name used by Senator Creed Phillips in the Flash. He patrolled the streets of Keystone and Central City as a vigilante who killed villains with his touch (which turned them to protoplasm) and had a split personality. He finally killed himself as his evil personality was trying to kill The Flash.
In Tales from the Dark Multiverse: Death of Superman, after Superman is killed by Doomsday the Eradicator merges with Lois Lane, giving her Kryptonian powers and permanently becomes the new Eradicator.

In other media

Television
 Elements of the Eradicator are incorporated in a clone of Superman nicknamed Kel-El / Superman X who appears in Legion of Super Heroes, voiced by Yuri Lowenthal. This version hails from the 41st century, was created by an artificial intelligence called K3NT to oppose Imperiex, and possesses a variety of different powers than Superman, such as an immunity to Kryptonite.
 The Eradicator device appears in Superman & Lois. This version was invented by Lara Lor-Van with the intention of saving Kryptonians' minds and souls following Krypton's destruction. However, Tal-Rho abuses the device as a means to eradicate human culture by implanting Kryptonian consciousnesses into Smallville's residents. Tal-Rho is eventually foiled by Superman, who uses a solar flare on the Eradicator to undo the conversions before taking the device to the Fortress of Solitude, where Tal-Rho recovers the device and uses it to implant General Zod's consciousness into a weakened Superman, who breaks free with help from John Henry Irons. In response, Tal-Rho uses the Eradicator to implant himself with thousands of Kryptonian life-forces, gaining the power to instantly implant said consciousnesses into humans. However, Irons uses a solar-powered kinetic hammer to depower and defeat Tal-Rho.

Film
 The Eradicator appears in Kevin Smith's script for Superman Lives. This version would have been a special suit created by Jor-El to serve as Superman's protector and rescue him from death.
 Elements of the Eradicator are incorporated into a Superman clone and a robot butler based in the Fortress of Solitude who both appear in Superman: Doomsday.
 The Eradicator appears in the DC Animated Movie Universe (DCAMU) films The Death of Superman and Reign of the Supermen, voiced by Charles Halford. This version is a guardian program that was part of the rocket ship that carried Kal-El to Earth and is capable of producing a hologram based on Superman.

Video games
 The Eradicator as "The Last Son of Krypton" appears as a playable character in The Death and Return of Superman.
 The "DC Rebirth" incarnation of the Eradicator appears as a playable character in Lego DC Super Villains.

Miscellaneous
The Eradicator appears in Superman: Doomsday & Beyond, voiced by Stuart Milligan.

See also
 List of Superman enemies

References

External links

DC Comics robots
DC Comics aliens
DC Comics extraterrestrial superheroes
DC Comics extraterrestrial supervillains
DC Comics objects
DC Comics superheroes
DC Comics supervillains
DC Comics characters with superhuman strength
Fictional physicians
DC Comics characters who are shapeshifters
DC Comics characters who can move at superhuman speeds 
DC Comics characters who have mental powers
DC Comics telekinetics 
DC Comics telepaths
Kryptonians
Robot superheroes
Robot supervillains
Fictional artificial intelligences
Fictional characters with absorption or parasitic abilities 
Fictional characters who can manipulate time 
Fictional characters who can turn intangible
Fictional characters with spirit possession or body swapping abilities
Fictional characters with elemental transmutation abilities
Fictional technopaths
Comics characters introduced in 1989
Science fiction weapons
Characters created by Roger Stern
Vigilante characters in comics
Superman characters